Fibulacamptus bisetosus is a species of harpacticoid copepod in the family Canthocamptidae. It is found in Australia.

The IUCN conservation status of Fibulacamptus bisetosus is "VU", vulnerable. The species faces a high risk of endangerment in the medium term. The IUCN status was reviewed in 1996.

References

Harpacticoida
Articles created by Qbugbot
Crustaceans described in 1987